Shamsabad (also Romanized as Shamsābād) is a village in Runiz Rural District, Runiz District, Estahban County, Fars Province, Iran. At the 2006 census, its population was 430, in 91 families.

References 

Populated places in Estahban County